James W. "Jim" Douglass (born 1937) is an American author, activist, and Christian theologian. He is a graduate of Santa Clara University. He and his wife, Shelley Douglass, founded the Ground Zero Center for Nonviolent Action in Poulsbo, Washington, and Mary’s House, a Catholic Worker house in Birmingham, Alabama. 
In 1997 the Douglasses received the Pacem in Terris Award.

Theology of nonviolence
Douglass is an author on nonviolence and Catholic theology, with many books and essays to his credit. Four of his monographs, published from 1968 to 1991, were reprinted in 2006 by theology publisher Wipf & Stock.

Douglass's 2008 book, JFK and the Unspeakable, discusses the John F. Kennedy assassination as a conspiracy ordered by unknown parties and carried out by the CIA with help from the Mafia and elements in the FBI to put an end to Kennedy's effort to end the Cold War after the Cuban Missile Crisis.

JFK and the Unspeakable was first published by Orbis Books in Maryknoll, New York (2008), and reprinted by Simon & Schuster's Touchstone Books (2010).

Activism
Douglass was a professor of religion at the University of Hawaii who first engaged in civil disobedience to protest against the Vietnam War.

In 1975 Jim and Shelley Douglass founded Ground Zero Center for Nonviolent Action to protest against the construction of a Trident missile nuclear submarine base on the Kitsap Peninsula in the U.S. state of Washington. The Douglasses, joined by other activists seeking to prevent the installation of Trident missiles, formed a small intentional community, the Pacific Life Community, near the submarine base. Their goal was to "seek the truth of a nonviolent way of life," both personally and politically. Personally we tried to confront our racism, sexism, consumerism — all the isms that allowed us to violate others. Politically, we chose to experiment with nonviolent actions resisting Trident, a system that seemed to epitomize all the violence of our society.

This nonviolent protest later extended to protesting against the White Train which carried nuclear missile parts to Bangor Trident Base.

The Douglasses later moved to the Ensley neighborhood of Birmingham, Alabama, to establish Mary's House, a "house of hospitality" for homeless or indigent people in need of long-term health care.

Douglass has traveled to the Middle East on several peace missions. In 2003 he joined a Christian Peacemaker Team in Iraq and stayed with civilians during the U.S.-led invasion.

Douglass is a member, and co-founder of, Religious Leaders for 9/11 Truth, an organization that questions the "official story" about the 9/11 attacks.

Works
 The Non-Violent Cross: A Theology of Revolution and Peace. Eugene, Oregon: Wipf & Stock (1969). p. 320..
 "The Human Revolution: A Search for Wholeness". In O'Gorman, Ned (ed.). Prophetic Voices: Ideas and Words on Revolution. New York: Random House. .
  Resistance and Contemplation: The Way of Liberation. Eugene, Oregon: Wipf & Stock (1972). p. 196. .
 Lightning East to West: Jesus, Gandhi, and the Nuclear Age. Eugene, Oregon: Wipf & Stock (1983). p. 112. .
 Dear Gandhi: Now What? Letters from Ground Zero, with Shelley Douglass and Bill Livermore. Philadelphia: New Society Publishers (1988). . .
 The Nonviolent Coming of God. Eugene, Oregon: Wipf & Stock (1992). p. 254. .
 Selections from the Writings of Shelley and Jim Douglass, with Shelley Douglass and Mary Evelyn Jegen. Erie, Pennsylvania: Pax Christi USA (1991). .
 A Question of Being: The Integration of Resistance and Contemplation in James Douglass's Theology of Nonviolence, with Karen Holsinger Sherman. Eugene, Oregon: Wipf & Stock (2007). p. 128. ISBN 978-1-55635-144-0.
 JFK and the Unspeakable: Why He Died and Why It Matters. Maryknoll, New York: Orbis Books (2008). pp. 544. .
 Gandhi and the Unspeakable: His Final Experiment with Truth. Maryknoll, New York: Orbis Books (2012). p. 158. .

References

External links
 Interview with Jim and Shelley Douglass
 Ground Zero Center for Nonviolent Action
 James W. Douglass collected papers from the Friends Historical Library of Swarthmore College

Nonviolence advocates
Living people
American anti-war activists
American Christian pacifists
Catholic Workers
Santa Clara University alumni
Researchers of the assassination of John F. Kennedy
1937 births
Catholic pacifists
People from Ensley, Alabama
People from Poulsbo, Washington